The Epic of Gilgamesh has directly inspired many manifestations of literature, art, music, and popular culture, as identified by Theodore Ziolkowski in the book Gilgamesh Among Us: Modern Encounters With the Ancient Epic (2011). It was only during and after the First World War that the first reliable translations of the epic appeared that reached a wide audience, and it was only after the Second World War that the epic of Gilgamesh began to make itself felt more broadly in a variety of genres. In the years following World War II, Gilgamesh, formerly an obscure figure known only by a few scholars, gradually became increasingly popular with modern audiences. The Epic of Gilgameshs existential themes made it particularly appealing to German authors in the years following the war. In his 1947 existentialist novel Die Stadt hinter dem Strom, the German novelist Hermann Kasack adapted elements of the epic into a metaphor for the aftermath of the destruction of World War II in Germany, portraying the bombed-out city of Hamburg as resembling the frightening Underworld seen by Enkidu in his dream. In Hans Henny Jahnn's magnum opus River Without Shores (1949–1950), the middle section of the trilogy centers around a composer whose twenty-year-long homoerotic relationship with a friend mirrors that of Gilgamesh with Enkidu and whose masterpiece turns out to be a symphony about Gilgamesh.

The Quest of Gilgamesh, a 1953 radio play by Douglas Geoffrey Bridson, helped popularize the epic in Britain. In the United States, Charles Olson praised the epic in his poems and essays and Gregory Corso believed that it contained ancient virtues capable of curing what he viewed as modern moral degeneracy. The 1966 postfigurative novel Gilgamesch by Guido Bachmann became a classic of German "queer literature" and set a decades-long international literary trend of portraying Gilgamesh and Enkidu as homosexual lovers. This trend proved so popular that the Epic of Gilgamesh itself is included in The Columbia Anthology of Gay Literature (1998) as a major early work of that genre. In the 1970s and 1980s, feminist literary critics analyzed the Epic of Gilgamesh as showing evidence for a transition from the original matriarchy of all humanity to modern patriarchy. As the Green Movement expanded in Europe, Gilgamesh's story began to be seen through an environmentalist lens, with Enkidu's death symbolizing man's separation from nature.

Theodore Ziolkowski, a scholar of modern literature, states, that "unlike most other figures from myth, literature, and history, Gilgamesh has established himself as an autonomous entity or simply a name, often independent of the epic context in which he originally became known. (As analogous examples one might think, for instance, of the Minotaur or Frankenstein's monster.)" The Epic of Gilgamesh has been translated into many major world languages and has become a staple of American world literature classes. Many contemporary authors and novelists have drawn inspiration from it, including an American avant-garde theater collective called "The Gilgamesh Group" and Joan London in her novel Gilgamesh (2001). The Great American Novel (1973) by Philip Roth features a character named "Gil Gamesh", who is the star pitcher of a fictional 1930s baseball team called the "Patriot League". Believing that he can never lose, Gil Gamesh throws a violent temper tantrum when an umpire goes against him and he is subsequently banished from baseball. He flees to the Soviet Union, where he is trained as a spy against the United States. Gil Gamesh reappears late in the novel as one of Joseph Stalin's spies and gives what American literary historian David Damrosch calls "an eerily casual description of his interrogation training in Soviet Russia." In 2000, a modern statue of Gilgamesh by the Assyrian sculptor Lewis Batros was unveiled at the University of Sydney in Australia.

Starting in the late twentieth century, the Epic of Gilgamesh began to be read again in Iraq. Saddam Hussein, the former President of Iraq, had a lifelong fascination with Gilgamesh. Hussein's first novel Zabibah and the King (2000) is an allegory for the Gulf War set in ancient Assyria that blends elements of the Epic of Gilgamesh and the One Thousand and One Nights. Like Gilgamesh, the king at the beginning of the novel is a brutal tyrant who misuses his power and oppresses his people, but, through the aid of a commoner woman named Zabibah, he grows into a more just ruler. When the United States pressured Hussein to step down in February 2003, Hussein gave a speech to a group of his generals posing the idea in a positive light by comparing himself to the epic hero.

Literature 

 The City beyond the River (1947) by Hermann Kasack. The epic becomes a metaphor for post-war Germany.
 River without Shores (1949–50) by Hans Henny Jahnn. The middle section is an analogy to the relationship between Gilgamesh and Enkidu.
 Charles Olson wrote about the epic in his essay "The Gate and the Center" and in such poems as "La Chute" and "Bigmans" (1950s and 60s).
 Gregory Corso, poems (1950s).
 The Time Masters (1953/1971) and Time Bomb by Wilson Tucker.  The protagonist, Gilbert Nash, has a mysterious past.
 Gilgamesh: Romanzo (1959) by Gian Franco Gianfilippi. The first in a wave of historical novels based on the epic. A wave including works in Italian (Paola Capriola), English (Robert Silverberg, Stephan Grundy), German (Harold Braem, Thomas Mielke), French (Jacques Cassabois), and Spanish (José Ortega).
 Gilgamesch (1966) by Guido Bachmann. An early classic of a genre Germans called "queer literature", it would inspire other works that examined the idea of a possible homosexual relationship between Gilgamesh and Enkidu. Other works include: Denmark (Henrik Bjelke), Germany (Thomas Mielke, Christian Kracht), France (Jacques Cassabois), and England (Edwin Morgan).
 In The Great American Novel (1973), a novel by author Philip Roth, the Gilgamesh myth is reworked into the tale of a fictional baseball player, Gil Gamesh, whose immortal aspirations are achieved by disappearing after his final game.
 In Lucifer's Hammer by Larry Niven and Jerry Pournelle, Gilgamesh is used to set the early timeline of events.
 Ölümsüzlük Ardında Gılgamış (Gilgamesh in Search of Immortality) (1981), a poetry book by Turkish poet Melih Cevdet Anday.
 Gilgamesh the King (1984) and To the Land of the Living (1986) by Robert Silverberg.  Silverberg also contributed works of short fiction concerning Gilgamesh to the Heroes in Hell shared world series of Bangsian fantasy.
 Contact (1985) by Carl Sagan. Chapter 22 is titled "Gilgamesh". It describes the efforts made by Hadden in his pursuit of immortality.
 In the Skin of a Lion (1987) by Michael Ondaatje. The title is a quote from Gilgamesh.
Timewyrm: Genesys (1991), by John Peel, is the first of the New Doctor Who Adventures published by Virgin. The book describes the Doctor meeting Gilgamesh, and relates the epic of Gilgamesh as a Doctor Who story.
 "Gilgamesh and the Homeboys" (1991), by Harry Turtledove, a time-displaced Gilgamesh meets Los Angeles street gangs. This short story was published in an obscure magazine and has never been reprinted as of 2018.
 How Like a God (1997) by Brenda Clough is based on the epic.
 In The Eternal Footman (1999) by James K. Morrow, a traveling troupe enacts a play based on the Gilgamesh canon.
 Gilgamesh (1999), historical fiction by Stephan Grundy which retells the legend.
 ghIlghameS (2000), a translation into the Klingon language. 
 In Jane Lindskold's Athanor novels (1998–9), Gilgamesh and Enkidu are immortals who inspire legends under other names, including King Arthur and Sir Bedivere, respectively.
 1001 Nights of Bacchus (2000), a graphic novel by Eddie Campbell, features a six-page collage story in which Gilgamesh is a Scottish-accented soccer hooligan near-incomprehensibly recounting the entire epic.  The story also appeared, in color, on the back covers of issues 22–26 of Campbell's Bacchus magazine.
Gilgamesh (2001) by Joan London, a postfiguration in which the epic becomes the structural key for a world torn by politics and betrayal (modern Armenia).
1979 (novel) (2001) by Christian Kracht, in which the epic provides the pattern for the homoerotic theme set against the background of the Iranian Revolution.
Fate/stay night (2004), a Japanese visual novel written by Kinoko Nasu and developed by Type-Moon features Gilgamesh as a major antagonist. He serves as the primary antagonist of the Unlimited Blade Works route.
Fate/Zero (2006), a Light Novel authored by Gen Urobuchi, illustrated by Takashi Takeuchi and written in collaboration with Type-Moon, features Gilgamesh as one of the summoned servants.
 Bartimaeus (book series), the titular Djinn was a servant to Gilgamesh (his first master) and aided him alongside the wildman Enkidu in defeating the giant Humbaba in addition to also assisting the demi-God king in building the walls of Uruk, a feat originally attributed to Gilgamesh alone.
 Stargate SG-1: Blood Ties (2007) by Sonny Whitelaw and Elizabeth Christensen has Doctor Daniel Jackson consult the Epic of Gilgamesh for clues about the threat that the characters are currently facing.
 Like Mayflies in a Stream (2009) by Shauna S. Roberts is a novelization of the first half of the epic from the viewpoint of Shamhat, who tamed Enkidu.
 The Sorceress: The Secrets of the Immortal Nicholas Flamel (2009), a novel in The Secrets of the Immortal Nicholas Flamel series by Michael Scott. Gilgamesh the King is described as a homeless man, immortal, and extraordinarily forgetful. He helps the twins, Sophie and Josh, to learn the magic of Water.
 "Long Time" by Rick Norwood, The Magazine of Fantasy and Science Fiction, Jan/Feb 2011, a retelling of the Gilgamesh legend by a cynical immortal soldier serving in Gilgamesh's army.
 Warm Bodies by Isaac Marion 2011. The Epic of Gilgamesh is mentioned as "one of the earliest known works of literature. Humanity's debut novel, you could say. Love, sex, blood and tears. A journey to find eternal life. To escape death."
Fate/strange fake (2015), a Light Novel written by Ryōgo Narita, illustrated by Morii Shizuki, a spin-off of both Fate/stay Night and Fate/Zero that originated as an April fool's joke in 2008 as Fate/states night.
 In Children of Time (novel) (2015), a science fiction novel written by Adrian Tchaikovsky, the main characters travel across space in a ship named the Gilgamesh.
 Fearless Inanna, by Jonathan Schork (2015), is loosely structured after the original Epic in twelve "books" and borrows translated passages in chapter 10. The Standard Babylonian Epic of Gilgamesh, by Simo Parpola (Eisenbrauns, 1997), is listed in the bibliography.
 Thick as Thieves (2017) by Megan Whalen Turner features a main character from a fictionalized version of the Persian empire who, throughout the course of the novel, recites from an ancient poem loosely based on the Epic of Gilgamesh. The two characters in the novel come to represent the main characters of the epic, known as Immakuk and Ennikar (Gilgamesh and Enkidu).
 "Enkidu", the opening story of Even This Wildest Hope (2019) by Seyward Goodhand, is a modern retelling of the Epic of Gilgamesh from the point of view of Enkidu. 
"Smokepit Fairytales" (2016) a science fiction novel by Tripp Ainsworth. A Marine and a Sailor accidentally stumble upon Utnapishtim's garden while deployed to Iraq and inadvertently become immortal. The novel pulled heavily from Gilgamesh as inspiration.
City of the Plague God (2021) a fantasy novel by Sarwat Chadda under the Rick Riordan Presents imprint, features protagonist Sikander "Sik" Aziz meeting Gilgamesh in the present day where Gilgamesh reveals that he really did become immortal, but had lied in the Epic of Gilgamesh and faked his death in order to keep other people from discovering the secret of immortality. Gilgamesh has become a pacifist dedicated to gardening and helps Sik create a cure for the plague spread by the Mesopotamian deity Nergal. Using his powers as the demigod son of Ninsun, Gilgamesh generates a hurricane over Manhattan for Sik to spread the cure in the form of rain. He later sends Sik his royal seal as a gift.

Classical music 
 The Epic of Gilgamesh (Martinů), 1955 choral work by the Czech composer Bohuslav Martinů
 Gilgamesh (Kodallı opera), 1962–64 opera in Turkish
 Gilgamesh (Saygun opera), 1964–70 Op.65 opera in Turkish
 Gilgamesh (Nørgård opera), 1971–72 opera in Danish by Per Nørgård
 Gilgamesh (Brucci opera), 1986 opera in Serbian by Rudolf Brucci
 Gilgamesh (Battiato opera), 1992 opera in Italian by Franco Battiato
Bilgamesh (Gilgamesh) (opera–ballet), 2009-12 opera in Sumerian and Akkadian by Ashot Ariyan
 ABUBU - The Great Flood (die Sintflut) (oratorium), 2023 by Enjott Schneider

Pop music 
 Girugamesh, name of Japanese rock band is a transliteration of Gilgamesh, some of their song names allude to the epic as well.
 "The Mesopotamians", a song by They Might Be Giants, features Gilgamesh, along with Sargon, Hammurabi, and Ashurbanipal (other rulers of Mesopotamia).
 He Who Saw the Deep, an album by iLiKETRAiNS, takes its title from an original styling of The Epic of Gilgamesh.
 "Gilgamesh", from the album Rapconteur by rap artist Baba Brinkman is a modern retelling of the epic in hip hop form.
 Gilgamesh, 2010 album from Australian alternative pop duo Gypsy & The Cat.
 Gilgamesh, 2015 album based on the epic by the Iraqi heavy metal band Acrassicauda.
 "Gilgameš", from the album Κατά τον δαίμονα εαυτού by extreme metal band Rotting Christ.
 "Golem II: The Bionic Vapour Boy" from the album California by Mike Patton's band Mr. Bungle mentions Gilgamesh.
 Gilgamesh, name of British jazz fusion band in the 1970s.
"The Edge of the World", from the album Reaching into Infinity by English power metal band DragonForce.
"Gilgamesh", from the 2020 album Ascension by American singer Sufjan Stevens.
 Lost in the Cedar Wood, the 2021 album by British singer-songwriter Johnny Flynn and British nature writer Robert Macfarlane, is loosely based on the Epic of Gilgamesh, aiming to compare the themes of the ancient work with the modern world in the context of the COVID-19 pandemic.

Theatre 

 1988 Girugameshu, a play by the Japanese scholar Takeshi Umehara. That play inspirated the Hayao Miyazaki's 1997 anime epic Princess Mononoke.
 1989 Turn left at Gilgamesh, a play by New York playwright Rory Winston.
 2007 (September/October). Gilgamesh in Uruk: GI in Iraq, adapted by Blake Bowden. Directed by Regina Pugh, with original music composed by Grammy-nominee, Steve Goers, and original puppetry by Aretta Baumgartner.
 2007 (July). Chronicles – the custom of lamenting, based on the adaptation and completed Polish translation of Gilgamesh by Robert Stiller. Directed by Grzegorz Brai with original music based on Albanian and Greek polyphonic laments. Produced by Song of the Goat Theatre in Poland.
 2007 (April). Gilgamesh, adapted by Yusef Komunyakaa and Chad Gracia. Original music composed and performed by Billy Atwell. This project was a part of the New York Institute for the Humanities "War Music Festival." Produced by the Classical Theatre of Harlem.
 2007 (March/April). Gilgamesh, adapted by Stephen Sachs. Directed by Sachs and Jessica Kubzansky. Produced by The Theatre @ Boston Court in Pasadena, CA.
 2017 (October). Gilgamesh, adapted by Piers Beckley. Directed by Ray Shell. Produced by White Bear Theatre in Kennington, London.
 2017 (October). Broken Stones, by Fin Kennedy. Directed by Seth Rozin. Produced by Interact Theatre Companyin Philadelphia, PA. Inspired by a true story, this meta-theatrical play follows a former U.S. Army Reservist who broke military protocol to safeguard the Baghdad Museum of Antiquities (the Iraq Museum) from being looted during the Iraq War. This museum houses Gilgamesh tablets, and the story references Gilgamesh. As the ex-soldier tells his harrowing saga to a Hollywood ghost writer, his story is manipulated into a more palatable narrative.

Film 
 The Epic of Gilgamesh, or This Unnameable Little Broom (1985) by the Quay Brothers is an animated short based on the Epic of Gilgamesh.
 In the film adaptation of the Unlimited Blade Works route of  Fate/Stay Night, Gilgamesh is the main antagonist who, with Kirei Kotomine, attempts a ritual to bring the Holy Grail into existence. This route has also been adapted as an anime series
 In the Heaven's Feel route of Fate/Stay Night, Gilgamesh is a minor character as a servant in the Holy Grail War in which he is easily defeated by Angra Mainyu who is possessing the heroine Sakura Matou. He is a main character in the other two routes, which have been adapted as two anime series and a movie.
 The Hayao Miyazaki's 1997 anime film Princess Mononoke is partially based on the Cedar Forest episode of The Epic of Gilgamesh.
 Gilgamesh, upcoming Argentinean animated film.

Television 
 Gilgamesh is referenced in both the prologue and epilogue of the 1964 episode of The Outer Limits, "Demon With a Glass Hand".
 Gilgamesh appears in an episode of Hercules: The Legendary Journeys, revealed to have turned his back on the gods after his family died while he was fighting their war. In his despair, he began worshipping the demon Dahak in a bid to have the gods destroyed as revenge. He manages to kill Hercules’ best friend Iolaus as a sacrifice for the demon, before Hercules kills Gilgamesh. He is a half-brother to another character in the series named Nebula.
 "Darmok", episode 2 of season 5 of Star Trek: The Next Generation, is a self-referential adaptation of Gilgamesh in a science fiction setting. Jean-Luc Picard references the epic directly as he attempts to communicate with a member of an alien species whose language consists entirely of allegory which references mythological and historical people and events from his culture.
 Gilgamesh anime, directed by Masahiko Murata.
 The Epic is seen in The Secret Saturdays, though with some alterations. Instead of telling the story of Gilgamesh's quest for immortality, it depicts his battle against an ancient Sumerian cryptid known as Kur.
 Gilgamesh is one of the Servants in the Holy Grail War of the Fate/Zero, Fate/stay night and the Fate/stay night: Unlimited Blade Works anime, in all three of which, he serves as a final antagonist who has an obsession with Saber; he merely desires to possess Saber and the Holy Grail (for the sake of it being a treasure) in the former two while he wants to destroy the world using the Holy Grail to rule over those who survive the cataclysm in the latter. He also appears in Fate/Grand Order - Absolute Demonic Front: Babylonia as the king of Uruk and a main character of the story.
 A child version of Gilgamesh appears in the anime series Fate/kaleid liner Prisma☆Illya
 Gilgamesh is comically referenced in Futurama season 7 episode 18 titled "The Inhuman Torch". Bender is compared to Gilgamesh after saving the earth from an evil personified flame.
 In Batman: The Animated Series, reference is made to Project Gilgamesh, from which the character Bane is born. (Season 3, Episode 1)
 Gilgamesh is referenced during a street play based on his story, in the Indian television series Bharat Ek Khoj episode 2, based on Indus Valley Civilization.
The Smiths must rescue Steve after he is kidnapped and taken to the North Pole, which is revealed to be the frozen over remains of the Cedar Forest. There, Santa Claus is using children to mine for precious stones from the Epic of Gilgamesh that he needs to perform an ancient ritual to revive Humbaba and claim his powers. American Dad (season 12, episode 7)
In The Tower of Druaga anime, the king of Babylim and the first person to climb the tower was named Gilgamesh.

Comics 
 Gilgamesh II, a satirical graphic novel by Jim Starlin in which an infant (the last of his doomed race) is rocketed to Earth Superman-fashion, but whose life follows the trajectory of the Gilgamesh legends.  ASIN B00071S7T8
 The Epic of Gilgamesh (2018), is a graphic novel covering the full Gilgamesh epic; rendered by Kent H. Dixon and illustrated by his son, Kevin H. Dixon. 
 In the final issue of Mage II: The Hero Defined (1999), Matt Wagner uses the Epic of Gilgamesh as a parallel to the life of Kevin Matchstick, who was previously compared to King Arthur.
 The Argentine comic book Gilgamesh the Immortal turns Gilgamesh into an immortal whose life spans across all human history and a post-apocalyptic future.
 In Marvel Comics Gilgamesh is one of the Eternals, a race of immortal beings that live on Olympia and have been mistaken for Gods over the millennia. Gilgamesh has performed many heroic feats, and has been mistaken for other heroes, such as Hercules. He is known as the Forgotten One after Zuras, the Leader of the Eternals, caused everybody on Earth to forget about him.
 The webcomic Abominable Charles Cristopher by Karl Kerschl features Gilgamesh as an adventurous king, who is initially trying to slay the unwitting protagonist when he approaches Gilgamesh's kingdom. Later their relationship evolves.
 The Unwritten by Mike Carey and Peter Gross, issue 32.5 (Feb 2012), retells part of the Epic in a way that fits the series' examination of story-telling in human history.
 Archer and Armstrong #0, written by Fred Van Lente and published by Valiant Comics features a retelling of the Epic of Gilgamesh from the point of view of one of the principal characters of the series, the immortal Aram Anni-Padda.

Video games 
 In Namco's action role-playing game Tower of Druaga, Gilgamesh is known as Gil and is the main hero who must ascend the floors of Druaga's tower to rescue Ki. The game spawned the Babylonian Castle Saga franchise.
 The pre-designed game packaged with Electronic Arts' Adventure Construction Set, Rivers of Light, follows the Epic of Gilgamesh.
 In Serious Sam: The Second Encounter, the eighth level was named as "Courtyards of Gilgamesh".
 The Final Fantasy series of video games includes, in some of its installments, a boss enemy named Gilgamesh and his "faithful sidekick" Enkidu. There are actually several variants of Gilgamesh in Final Fantasy, as the series has no shared in-universe continuity, though there is usually some reference to him being a fierce warrior who collects swords and many iterations of him have as many as six arms.
 Gilgamesh is the leader of the Sumerian civilization in the Civilization III Conquests expansion pack, Civilization IV Beyond the Sword expansion pack, and Civilization VI.
 In Namco's video game Tales of Phantasia, one of Cress Albaine's titles is Gilgamesh, which can be obtained finding particular objects.
 In Capcom's video game Devil May Cry 4 Gilgamesh is a pair of boots and gauntlets that are worn and used by second protagonist Dante, possibly in reference to a similar weapon featured in earlier games in the series, named after Beowulf, another epic poem.
 In the Sir-Tech game Wizardry: Proving Grounds of the Mad Overlord, players construct their adventure party at Gilgamesh's Tavern.
 In the Type-Moon visual novel game Fate/stay night, Gilgamesh is one of the antagonists of the series. He also appears in the sequel game, Fate/hollow ataraxia, as both his main self and as a child version of himself; and in "Fate/Extra CCC" and Fate/Extella: The Umbral Star as a playable character.
 In the Japanese collectible card game Shadowverse, Gilgamesh is an uncommon playable card.
 In the WonderPlanet inc. mobile-game Crash Fever, Gilgamesh is an obtainable unit in an ultimate wizard quest.
 In the mobile game Fate/Grand Order, Gilgamesh appears as a summonable servant in three different variants: as a child, in his Fate/Stay Night form prior to meeting Enkidu, and a wiser version from his time as king after the conclusion of The Epic. He is one of the main protagonists in the game's Seventh Singularity, which takes place in Ancient Mesopotamia, the arcade version of the game also has a babylonian singularity, in which Gilgamesh is cloned and Nebuchadnezzar II is summoned into his clone's body by the Beast of 666.
 In Assassin's Creed: Origins (2017), a sword originated from Mesopotamia known as "Humbaba's Fang" was carved by Gilgamesh from the tooth of Humbaba.
 In Hades (2020), the fourth aspect of the Twin Fists of Malphon is the Aspect of Gilgamesh.
 In Smite, the second 2021 Babylonian god is Gilgamesh, who battles Tiamat in the story.

Children's literature 
 Gilgamesh.  (1967).  Written and illustrated by Bernarda Bryson.  Henry Holt & Co.  .  1st edition is out of print.
 Gilgamesh: Man's First Story (2005).  Written and illustrated by Bernarda Bryson Shahn.  Whole Spirit Press , 2nd edition reissue.
 Gilgamesh the King (1991).  Written and illustrated by Ludmila Zeman.  Tundra Books.   (0-88776-283-2).
 The Revenge of Ishtar (1993).  Written and illustrated by Ludmila Zeman.  Tundra Books.   (0-88776-315-4).
 The Last Quest of Gilgamesh (1995).  Written and illustrated by Ludmila Zeman.  Tundra Books.   (0-88776-328-6).
 Gilgamesh the Hero (2003).  Retold by Geraldine McCaughrean, illustrated by David Parkins.  Eerdmans Books for Young Readers.  .
 Lugalbanda:  The Boy who got Caught up in a War  (2006).  by Kathy Henderson, illustrated by Jane Ray.  Candlewick.  .

References

Bibliography 

 
 
 

Mythology in popular culture
Works based on the Epic of Gilgamesh
 
Ancient Mesopotamia in popular culture